Rehobeth may refer to a location in the United States:

 Rehobeth, Alabama
 Rehobeth, Maryland

See also

 Rehoboth (disambiguation)